American singer-songwriter Leigh Nash has released three studio albums and five extended plays as well as a number of collaborations.

Studio albums

Extended plays

Singles

Collaborations

Albums

Singles

Compilations

Soundtrack

Music videos

References

Discographies of American artists
Pop music discographies